The Pecsætan (singular , literally "Peak-dweller"), also called Peaklanders or Peakrills in modern English, were an Anglo-Saxon tribe who inhabited the central and northern parts of the Peak District area in England.

The area was in the southern part of the Brigantia, a Brythonic tribal domain. Early Anglo-Saxon settlements were by West Angles. This tribe advanced up the valleys of the rivers Derwent and Dove during their northern conquests in the 6th century. The area became known locally as the Pecsætan, Peak-set or land of the Peak peoples. Later their territory formed the northern division of Mercia, and in 848 the Mercian Witenagemot assembled at Repton.

In A tour thro' the whole island of Great Britain, Daniel Defoe mentions a later group of people called The Peakrills writing, "The Peakrills, as they are called, are a rude boorish kind of People; but bold, daring, and even desperate in their Search into the Bowels of the Earth: for which Reason they are often employed by our Engineers in the Wars to carry on the Sap, when they lay Siege to strong fortified Places."

References

Further reading
Bigsby, R. (1854) Historical and Topographical Description of Repton. London.
Collis, J. (1983) Wigber Low Derbyshire: A Bronze Age and Anglian Burial site in the White Peak. Department of Archaeology and Prehistory, University of Sheffield.
Davies, W. and Vierk, H. "The contexts of Tribal Hidage: social aggregates and settlement patterns", in Frühmittelalterliche Studien, viii (1974)
Dumville, D. "The Tribal Hidage: an introduction to its texts and their history", in The Origins of the Anglo-Saxon Kingdoms ed. S.Bassett, 1989. 
Fowler, M. J. (1954) "The Anglian Settlement of the Derbyshire and Staffordshire Peak District." DAJ 74, 134–151.
Hart, C. R. (1981) The North Derbyshire Archaeological Survey. Leeds: A. Wigley & Sons
Hodges, R. and Wildgoose, M. (1980) "Roman or native in the White Peak", in Branigan, K. (ed) Rome and the Brigantes, 48–53. Sheffield, Sheffield University Press.
Hodges, R. (1991a) "Notes on the Medieval Archaeology of the White Peak." In R. Hodges and K. Smith (eds) Recent Developments in the Archaeology of the Peak District :111–122 (Sheffield Archaeological Monographs 2) Sheffield.
Hughes, R. G (1961) "Archaeological Sites in the Trent Valley, South Derbyshire" DAJ 81, 149–50.
Jones, H. (1997) The Region of Derbyshire and North Staffordshire from AD350 to AD700: an analysis of Romano-British and Anglian barrow use in the White Peak. Ph.D. thesis, University of  Nottingham.
  
Roffe, D. (1986b) "The Origins of Derbyshire" DAJ 106, 102–112.
Rollason et al.
Routh, T. (1937) "A Corpus of the Pre-Conquest Carved Stones of Derbyshire" DAJ 58, 1–46.
Sidebottom, P.C. (1994), Schools of Anglo-Saxon Stone Sculpture in the North Midlands. Unpublished PhD Thesis, University of Sheffield.
Sidebottom P.C (1999) "Stone Crosses in the Peak and the Sons of Eadwulf." DAJ 119, 206–19.
Stenton, F. (1905) "Introduction to the Derbyshire Domesday", in W. Page (ed) The Victoria History of the County of Derbyshire. London.
Unwin, T. (1988) "Towards a model of Anglo-Scandinavian rural settlement in England", in Hooke, D. (ed) Anglo-Saxon Settlements, 77–98.
Yorke, B. (1990) Kings and Kingdoms of Early Anglo-Saxon England, London: Seaby.

External links
East Midlands Archaeological Research Framework: Resource Assessment of Anglo-Saxon Derbyshire, An Archaeological Resource Assessment of Anglo-Saxon Derbyshire, by Dave Barrett, Derbyshire County Council

Peoples of Anglo-Saxon Mercia
Peak District
Petty kingdoms of England